Trichocorixa verticalis is a species of water boatman in the family Corixidae. It is found in the Caribbean Sea, Central America, and North America.

Subspecies
These six subspecies belong to the species Trichocorixa verticalis:
 Trichocorixa verticalis californica Sailer, 1948
 Trichocorixa verticalis fenestrata Walley, 1930
 Trichocorixa verticalis interiores Sailer, 1948
 Trichocorixa verticalis saltoni Sailer, 1948
 Trichocorixa verticalis sellaris (Abbott, 1913)
 Trichocorixa verticalis verticalis (Fieber, 1851)

References

Articles created by Qbugbot
Insects described in 1851
Corixini